Nagazeh-ye Kuchak (also Romanized as Nagāẕeh-ye Kūchak and Negāzeh-ye Kūchak; also known as Nagāşeh-ye Kūchek, Neqāşeh-ye Kūchek, Neqāzeh Kūchek, and Neqāzeh-ye Kūchek) is a village in Veys Rural District, Veys District, Bavi County, Khuzestan Province, Iran. At the 2006 census, its population was 308, in 38 families.

References 

Populated places in Bavi County